Mallick Ibrahim Bayu was a legendary Sufi saint-warrior who arrived in South Bihar in the 14th century and defeated the tribal Kol chiefdoms who had been oppressing the local Muslims. He also defeated Raja Birthal and became first Muslim conqueror and governor of Bihar. Malik Ibrahim Baya tomb is protected under Archaeological Survey of India and is a tourism spot in Bihar Sharif.

Early life
Syed Ibrahim Mallick was a distinguished military general, and an eminent Sufi (saint) as well. He was a descendant of Ali and when the Abbasids persecuted his ancestors, they escaped to Ghazni. He was born and raised in Ghazni.

Syed Ibrahim Mallick received his education and military training in Ghazni and then he came to Delhi to serve under the tutelage of Sultan Muhammad bin Tughlaq, who was famous for his magnificent patronage of intellectuals, scholars, and talented military generals of his time. Besides Syed Ibrahim Mallick, Ibn Batuta, the famous traveler and pioneer explorer, and other people like him came from all over the world to serve the Sultan Muhammad bin Tughlaq.

History
Ibrahim Mallick Beya, belongs to Suhrawardiyya order.  He came to India during the time of Sul-tan Muhammad Tughlaq and became commander-in-chief in 725 A.H. (1324 A.D.). The word Bayu' is the twisted from a Persian word *Beya' meaning "Come on.' Syed ibrahim, after his first victory over Bihar, went to inform the matter to Sultan Muhammad Tughlaq, who being pleased with his remarkable win said: "malik biya benashin' (O ChiefCome and Sit down). Mallick was a title conferred on important personalities for remarkable work. Syed Ibrahim also got this title. With passage of time the term Beya was twisted and became Bayu.
During the time of Sultan Tughlaq (1290 AD-1351 AD), even though the State of Bihar was under the control of Delhi, for all practical purposes, its rulers were autonomous. The Sultan received numerous complaints against the Raja Bithal, the Governor (Subedar) of Bihar, who was not only a tyrant but also a rebel against the Sultan of Delhi.

The Sultan sent his general, Syed Ibrahim Mallick, to punish Raja Bithal. After a fierce battle, the Raja was killed and his army was defeated. The conquest of Bihar was a remarkable achievement, and on this occasion, the Sultan conferred upon Syed Ibrahim Mallick the title of "Madarul Mulk" means Mallick or Saif-o-Daulat (Administrator and King of Sword and Wealth). It is recorded that the Sultan was so jubilant by this victory, that in his court he himself came down to receive and greet Syed Ibrahim Mallick. After an exchange of greetings, Sultan Mohammad bin Tughlaq said to Syed Ibrahim Mallick in Persian (the official language at the time) "Mallicks Baya, Be-nashin" meaning "O King come and sit next to me" and led Syed Ibrahim Mallick to his seat. The Sultan bestowed this great honor upon him. Since then, he was called "Malliks Baya". The Sultan appointed Syed Ibrahim Mallick as the governor of the state of Bihar. He chose to settle with his family and relatives in Bihar Sharif.

In Bihar, Syed Ibrahim Mallick led many expeditions such as Deora and Khatangi etc., and defeated Raja Baithal and was appointed Governor of Bihar by Sultan Mohammad bin Tughlaq. Syed Ibrahim Mallick also served as Governor of Bihar and general for a few years from 1351 to 1353 AD/751-753 AH, during the reign of Sultan Firoz Shah Tughlaq, Cousin of Sultan Muhammad bin Tughluq. During his reign, he fought his last pitched battles with Raja Hans Kumar and conquer Rohtasgarh Fort.

Assassination
When the fighting finally stopped, Syed Ibrahim Mallick established law and order in the region. After peace prevailed, one night Syed Ibrahim Mallick Baya left the fort, when a group of enemy soldiers, hiding in the darkness outside the fort, perpetrated a sneak attack on this general from behind and killed him. Syed Ibrahim Mallick died on Sunday, 13th Dul Hajj 753 AH corresponding to 20 January 1353 AD. His body was brought to Bihar Sharif for burial, where he had lived nearly his entire life with his family, relatives, and kinsmen.

Legacy

The descendants of the eight children of Syed Ibrahim Mallick Baya multiplied over 600 years and constituted a significant portion of the Muslim community in Bihar. The tomb is said to have built by Syed Daud Mallick, The eldest of the seven sons of the saint, who is also buried inside the tomb. The tomb of Syed Ibrahim Mallick is located in Bihar Sharif, at the hilltop of Budhha Pahari, one mile west of the town. The foundation stone of tomb of Syed lbrahim was laid by Makhdum Jahan Bihari, Mukhdum Ahmed Chirampush and Makhdum Shah Ahmed Sistani. The mausoleum is an extraordinary structure of a rare quality of bricks, which have withstood the ravages of time and the unrelenting devastation of weather for the last 600 years.

After 600 years, the structure stands as if it were built in recent days.

See also
 Bihar Sharif

References

Sources
 Articles on mysticism of Ibn Arabi from the Muhyiddin Ibn Arabi Society
 Mysticism in Islam a lecture by William Chittick
 Sufism From a site dedicated to various esoteric systems
  from SUFIS OF INDIA PAKISTAN AND BANGLADESH :volume-1 BY Nagendra Kr Singh page no -256
  from Sufi movements in eastern India by Mohammad Yahya Tamizi.page no-199
  from BIOGRAPHICAL ENCYCYCOPEDIA OF SUFIS SOUTH ASIA By N.Hanif  IN PAGE NO-160.

Indian people of Arab descent
Afghan Arabs
Indian Sufis
History of Bihar
Delhi Sultanate
1353 deaths
Assassinated people in the medieval Islamic world
Year of birth unknown
People from Bihar Sharif